William or Bill Wilkinson may refer to:
William Alexander Wilkinson (1892–1983), Australian born British soldier and cricketer
William Arthur Wilkinson (1795–1865), British Member of Parliament (MP) for Lambeth 1852–57
William Wilkinson (diplomat) (died 1836), British Consul to Wallachia and Moldavia
William Wilkinson (architect) (1819–1901), Gothic Revival architect who practised in Oxford
William Cleaver Wilkinson (1833–1920), American Baptist minister and professor
William Henry Wilkinson (1858–1930), British Sinologist who served as Consul-General for H.B.M in China and Korea in the 19th century
William Henry Wilkinson (trade unionist) (1850–1906), British trade union leader
William Wilkinson (New South Wales politician) (1858–1946), Australian politician and doctor
William Wilkinson (cricketer, born 1857) (1857–1946), Australian-born physician and cricketer who played in England
William Wilkinson (cricketer, born 1859) (1859–1940), English cricketer
William Wilkinson (cricketer, born 1881) (1881–1961), English cricketer and footballer
William Wilkinson (Australian cricketer) (1899–1974), Australian cricketer
William Wilkinson (footballer), goalkeeper active in England in the 1890s
William Wilkinson (priest) (1897–?), Anglican priest
William Birkinshaw Wilkinson (1854–1927), member of the Royal Geographical Society
Bill Wilkinson (ice hockey) (born 1947), Canadian college ice hockey coach
Bill Wilkinson (baseball) (born 1964), American baseball player
Will Wilkinson (born 1973), Canadian American libertarian writer
Bill Wilkinson (athlete) (born 1934), English athlete